This list of hospitals in Ethiopia lists the notable hospitals in Ethiopia.  The list is organized  by region and city.  The first Ethiopian hospital was established in 1897.  As of 1988, there were 87 hospitals in Ehtiopia with 11,296 beds.
Medical care in Ethiopia, a nation of more than 100 million people, is provided by numerous clinics in the countryside, and hospitals located mostly in larger towns.
There are about 144 regional hospitals placed in the major cities and towns. Out of the total 144 hospitals, about 90 of them are public. The rest, about 54 hospitals, are run by private investors and non-profit organizations.

Addis Ababa
As of 2014, the capital of Ethiopia, Addis Ababa, had more than 52 hospitals, 12 of them state run, and more than 40 private. The following hospitals are in Addis Ababa, a chartered city in the Regional State of Oromia.

 Addis Ababa Fistula Hospital,  
 Addis General Hospital, 
 Addis Hiwot General Hospital, 
 ALERT General Hospital,
 Amanuel Mental Hospital, 
 Amin General Hospital. 
 Anania Mothers and Children Specialized Medical Center, 
 Armed Forces Comprehensive Specialized Hospital (formerly the Princess Tsehai Memorial Hospital), 
 Bella Military Referral Hospital (formerly the Bella Haileselasse Hospital), 
 Betsegah Mother and Child Health Hospital, 
 Betezata General Hospital
 Bethel Teaching General Hospital, 
 Black Lion Comprehensive Specialized Hospital (Cancer Treatment)
 Brass Mother and Child Health Hospital, 
 Dagmawi Minilik Hospital, 
 Balcha Hospital lideta, 
 Dinberua Maternity Hospital, 
 Eka Kotebe General Hospital, 
 Ethio Tebib General Hospital, 
 Federal Police Referral Hospital, 
 Girum General Hospital, 
 Hayat Hospital, 
 Hallelujah General Hospital, 
 International Cardiovascular and Medical Center, 
 Kadisco General Hospital, 
 Landmark General Hospital, 
 Myungsung Christian Medical Center Comprehensive Specialized Hospital, Bole Medhanealem, 
 Nordic Medical Center, 
 Novocare American Clinic, 
 Ras Desta Damtew Hospital, 
 Saint Gabriel General Hospital, 
 Shedeho Internal Medicine Clinic, 
 St. Paul's Comprehensive Specialized Hospital, 
 St. Peter Referral Hospital, 
 St. Yared General Hospital, 
 Tibebu Hospital, 
 Tikur Anbesa Teaching Hospital, (Tikur Anbesa Specialized Hospital, TASH) (state run), 
 Tirunesh Beijing General Hospital, 
 Tzna General Hospital, 
 Yerer Hospital, 
 Zenbaba General Hospital, 
 Zewditu Hospital (state run)

Afar Region
The following hospitals are in the Afar Region:
Abala Hospital, 
Asaita District Hospital, 
Dalifage Primary Hospital, 
Dubti General Hospital, 
Kelewan General Hospital, 
Logiya Health Center. 
Mohammed Aklie Memorial Hospital,

Amhara Region
The following notable hospitals are generally in the Amhara Region:
Debre Birhan Comprehensive Specialized Hospital, Debre Birhan, 
Debre Markos Comprehensive Specialized Hospital, Debre Markos, 
Debretabor Comprehensive Specialized Hospital, Debre Tabor
Fitchie Comprehensive Specialized Hospital, Fiche,

Dessie
The following hospitals are in Dessie, Amhara Region:
Bati General Hospital, 
Boru Meda Hospital
Dessie Comprehensive Specialized Hospital, Dessie
Ethio Hospital
Selam General Hospital,

Gondar
The following hospitals are in Gondar, Amhara Region:
Dansha Hospital, 
Humera Health Center, 
Ibex Hospital, 
University of Gondar Hospital,

Benishangul-Gumuz Region
In 2007, there were only two hospitals run by the Ministry of Public Health and private entities in the Benishangul-Gumuz Region.

Dire Dawa Chartered City
In 2007, there were only four hospitals run by the Ministry of Public Health and private entities in the Dire Dawa chartered city.

Gambela Region
In 2007, there was only one hospital run by the Ministry of Public Health and private entities in the Gambela Region.

Harari Region
The following hospitals are in Harar, Harari Region:
Harar General Hospital, 
Haramaya University Hiwot Fana Comprehensive Specialized Hospital,

Oromia Region

The following hospitals are in Adama, Oromia Regional State:
Adama General Hospital & Medical College, 
Adama Referral Hospital, 
Rift Valley Hospital & Medical College, 
Sister Aklesia Memorial Hospital (private), 
Wonji Hospital, Wenji Gefersa,

Sidama Region
The following hospitals are in Hawassa, Sidama Region:
 Adare Hospital, 
 Alatyon Primary Hospital, 
 Asher Primary Hospital, 
 Bete Abrham Primary Hospital
 Hawassa University Referral Hospital, 
Kibru Primary Hospital, 
 Masresha Lema
South Command Military Hospital, 
 Yanet Internal Medicine Specialized Center, 
 Yanet Trauma and Surgery Specialized Center, 
 Abem Primary Hospital

SNNPR Region
The following hospitals are in the Wolayta Zone, Southern Nations, Nationalities, and Peoples' Region:
Soddo Christian Hospital, 
Wolaita Sodo University Teaching Referral Hospital, 
St Mary's Hospital, Dubbo, 
 Arba Minch General Hospital (state run)
Jinka General Hospital,

Somali Region
The following hospitals are in the Somali Region:
 Dagahbour General Hospital, Degehabur woreda
 Filtu General Hospital, Filtu, 
 Gode General Hospital, Gode
 Hargelle General Hospital, Hargelle
 Jigjiga Suldan Shiek hassan Yabare University Referral Hospital, Jigjiga, 
 Karamara General Hospital, Jijiga, 
 Qabri Dahare General Hospital, Kebri Dahar
 Sitti General Hospital, Bike
 Warder General Hospital, Werder

Tigray Region
The following hospitals are in the Tigray Region:

Abiy Addi District Hospital, Abiy Addi
Adigrat General Hospital, Adigrat
Adwa District Hospital, Adwa woreda
Axum Referral Hospital, Axum
Axum University Referral Hospital, Axum
Alamata District Hospital, Alamata
Ayder Referral Hospital
Lemelem Karl Zonal Hospital
Mekelle General Hospital, Mekelle
Quiha District Hospital
St. Mary's Hospital, Axum
Sihul General Hospital
Wukro District Hospital, Wukro

During the Tigray War, most of the healthcare facilities in the region had been looted, vandalised, or destroyed. Many hospitals had been occupied by military forces as their base and to tend to their injured soldiers.

See also
Healthcare in Ethiopia
Regions of Ethiopia

References

Notes

General references

Ethiopia
Hospitals
 List
Ethiopia